Landscape with Three Figures is a c.1645-1650 oil on canvas painting by Nicolas Poussin, now in the Prado Museum in Madrid. Poussin moved to landscape late in life.

References

Landscape paintings
Paintings by Nicolas Poussin
1640s paintings
Paintings of the Museo del Prado by French artists